James Vernon Smith (July 23, 1926 – June 23, 1973) was an American politician and a U.S. Representative from Oklahoma.

Biography
Born in Oklahoma City, Oklahoma, Smith was the son of Fred O. and Josephine Meder Smith, and was educated in Tuttle public schools and attended Oklahoma College of Liberal Arts at Chickasha, Oklahoma. He married Mary Belle Couch, and the couple had three children, Jay, Sarah, and Lee Ann.

Career
Smith engaged in farming and cattle raising, and served as member of the board of regents of Oklahoma Four-Year Colleges.

Elected as a Republican to the 90th Congress, Smith served from January 3, 1967 to January 3, 1969. Smith voted against the Civil Rights Act of 1968. He was an unsuccessful candidate for reelection in 1968. After a 1967 redistricting plan forced him into running against either fellow Republican Happy Camp or Democrat Tom Steed, he chose to take on Steed, a conservative Democrat from Shawnee who had nearly been defeated in 1966. Smith was defeated by a 54% to 46% tally despite the fact that Nixon won a plurality in the newly drawn district.

Nominated by President Nixon to be Administrator of Farmers Home Administration and confirmed by the Senate on March 16, 1969, Smith served until his resignation in 1973.

Death
Smith died in a wheat field fire at his farm, near Chickasha, Grady County, Oklahoma, on June 23, 1973 (age 46 years, 335 days). He is interred at Fairlawn Cemetery, Chickasha, Oklahoma.

References

External links

 

1926 births
1973 deaths
Politicians from Oklahoma City
People from Chickasha, Oklahoma
Farmers from Oklahoma
Accidental deaths in Oklahoma
Deaths from fire in the United States
Republican Party members of the United States House of Representatives from Oklahoma
People from Tuttle, Oklahoma
20th-century American businesspeople
University of Science and Arts of Oklahoma alumni
20th-century American politicians
Lawyers from Oklahoma City
Businesspeople from Oklahoma City
United States Department of Agriculture officials
20th-century American lawyers